Bojayá is a municipality in the Chocó Department, Colombia, its municipal centre is the town Bellavista Nuevo. The Bojayá massacre occurred in the original Bellavista on May 2, 2002.

An essentially new town was constructed, on a hill to avoid flooding, one kilometer upriver from the original Bellavista in 2003, and inaugurated in 2007. Whereby the original Bellavista was renamed to Bellavista Viejo (Old Bellavista in Spanish), and the new town Bellavista Nuevo (New Bellavista). Bellavista Viejo is currently completely abandoned.

Bojaya municipality 
The Bojaya municipality, according to a 2005 census, has 9941 inhabitants. 58.4% of the population of the municipality is afro-Colombian, and 41.4% and indigenous Embera. 95.86% of the population do not have their basic needs met.

The municipality contains part of the Utría National Natural Park.

There is still paramilitary and presence of the ELN in the region, tensions and violence between the groups are still threatening the population in the region.

Bellavista Nuevo 
Half of the inhabitants of the Bojayá region live in the municipal centre, Bellavista. After the massacre, only a part of the population remained or returned to the region. The remains of the victims of the massacre are buried in the new town, a mausoleum has also been built in their memory.

Relocation 
The new town one kilometer south of the original position. was built after the Bojayá massacre by the Colombian government. The relocation of Bellavista was announced on May 7, 2002, 5 days after the massacre by president Andrés Pastrana who visited the region after the massacre. The main reason for the relocation, namely the frequent flooding of the town, is a reality not exclusive to Bellavista, but rather common to the region. The majority of the town was in favour of a relocation, but the town was torn on the issue. The university Universidad Javeriana in Bogotá was put in charge of the design of the new town. The 265 houses were built of concrete, exceptional in the region, and provided with, among other services, a water installation and electricity.

Bellavista Viejo 
The old town, Bellavista Viejo, is currently completely abandoned. The old San Pablo Apóstol church has been restored after the massacre in 2002, and is being maintained in memory of the tragic event. Every year, on the second of May, a memorial is held in the church. During this service, the statue of Christ mutilated in the massacre, el Christo Mutilado de Bojaya, is brought in a procession by river, from the new church in Bellavista Nuevo to Bellavista Viejo.

Climate
Bellavista Nuevo, the capital of Bojayá has a very wet tropical rainforest climate (Af).

References

External links 
 Revista Semana: Un Pueblo a la Espera

Municipalities of Chocó Department